Lomax is a village in Henderson County, Illinois, United States. The population was 454 at the 2010 census, a decline from 477 in 2000. It is part of the Burlington, IA–IL Micropolitan Statistical Area.

Geography
Lomax is located in southwestern Henderson County at  (40.679763, -91.072341). Illinois Route 96 passes through the village, leading east  to Illinois Route 94 north of Terre Haute and southwest  to Dallas City along the Mississippi River.

Demographics

As of the census of 2000, there were 477 people, 196 households, and 134 families residing in the village. The racial makeup of the village was 98.74% White, 0.21% Asian, 0.42% from other races, and 0.63% from two or more races. Hispanic or Latino of any race were 2.73% of the population.

There were 196 households, out of which 32.7% had children under the age of 18 living with them, 52.6% were married couples living together, 9.7% had a female householder with no husband present, and 31.6% were non-families. 28.1% of all households were made up of individuals, and 15.3% had someone living alone who was 65 years of age or older.  The average household size was 2.43 and the average family size was 2.94.

In the village, the population was spread out, with 24.9% under the age of 18, 11.9% from 18 to 24, 26.0% from 25 to 44, 23.3% from 45 to 64, and 13.8% who were 65 years of age or older.  The median age was 36 years. For every 100 females, there were 90.0 males.  For every 100 females age 18 and over, there were 94.6 males.

The median income for a household in the village was $29,609, and the median income for a family was $36,736. Males had a median income of $30,875 versus $18,750 for females. The per capita income for the village was $14,066.  About 5.0% of families and 11.4% of the population were below the poverty line, including 10.9% of those under age 18 and 16.1% of those age 65 or over.

References

Villages in Henderson County, Illinois
Villages in Illinois
Burlington, Iowa micropolitan area
Illinois populated places on the Mississippi River